Yulee is a Census county division (CCD) in Nassau County, Florida, United States. It is situated in northeastern Florida, directly south of the Florida/Georgia state line (St. Marys River), and 24 miles north of downtown Jacksonville, Florida. The community’s population is currently 28,798 as of April 2018. Yulee is part of the Jacksonville metropolitan area, which was home to 1,504,980 people in 2017. Today, the Yulee CCD is a residential bedroom community for those who commute to Jacksonville,  Naval Submarine Base Kings Bay, or other locations in Southeast Georgia, but is working to diversify its tax base.

Yulee is within 15 miles of Amelia Island and the Jacksonville International Airport and is home to the Florida State College at Jacksonville's Nassau Center, the White Oak Conservation, two renown golf courses, the Nassau Wildlife Management Area, Robert M. Foster Justice Center, Four Creeks State Forest, the Yulee Branch Library, Nassau County Sheriff's Office Headquarters, and the Florida Welcome Center on Interstate 95. In addition the Yulee CCD is provided regional services by the Jacksonville Transportation Authority.

History
A post office called Yulee has been in operation since 1893. The community was named for David Levy Yulee, a United States senator from Florida.

Geography
According to the Fernandina Observer, the Yulee CCD has a total area of 414.4 km (180.0 mi2).

Neighborhoods
There are more than 10 neighborhoods within Yulee CCD.

Area code
The Yulee CCD is covered by area code:
 904

ZIP codes
The Yulee CCD is covered by several ZIP codes:
 32041
 32097
 32034 - which it shares with Fernandina Beach/Amelia Island

Other unincorporated communities
Nassauville
O'Neil

Demographics

According to the Fernandina Observer it stated that the entire Yulee Census County Division had a total population of 28,798 as of April 22, 2018.

The racial makeup of Yulee in 2014 was 89.2% White, 7.0% African American, 0.1% Native American, 1.6% Asian, 0.0% Pacific Islander, 0.1% from other races, and 2.1% from two or more races. Hispanic or Latino of any race were 1.9% of the population. 77.9% of the population was 18 years of age or older.

Climate
Like much of the south Atlantic region of the United States, the Yulee has a humid subtropical climate (Köppen Cfa), with mild weather during winters and hot and humid weather during summers. Seasonal rainfall is concentrated in the warmest months from May through September, while the driest months are from November through April. Due to Yulee's low latitude and proximity to the coast it allows for very little cold weather, and winters are typically mild and sunny.

Economy

The average household income is $71,477 and the average home value is $234,194. In total there are 5,242 total housing units and of which 3,493 are owner occupied, 1,323 are renter occupied, and 426 units are vacant.

Yulee has a number of outdoor festivals and events, the most prominent of which is the annual Holiday Festival and Parade. Yulee has numerous restaurants, cafes, and several bars. By night, Yulee offers nightlife frequented by locals, young professionals, students from the nearby college, and tourists. Yulee has a sports complex and gymnasium.

Yulee is home to two world-class golf courses: The Golf Club at North Hampton was designed in part by Arnold Palmer, and is over 7,000 acres, has 18 holes and a 72 par. and the Amelia National Golf & Country Club, designed by Tom Fazio which has 18 holes and a 72 par.

Yulee is the headquarters for the Nassau County Economic Development Board, which represents all of Nassau County as a desirable place to relocate a business or to expand an existing business. The Nassau County Sheriff's Office is also headquartered in Yulee. In November 2017 it was announced that the University of Florida will be building two health and fitness facilities. In January 2018 the large energy company Florida Public Utilities announced that they will be relocating to Yulee and will be building a new 55,000 square foot corporate headquarters.

The Florida Welcome Center located in northern Yulee is a "tourist information house", located near the Florida/Georgia state line on I-95. This center provides incoming visitors with a variety of information on travel, highways, sports, climate, accommodations, cities, outdoor recreation, and attractions. In tribute to the citrus industry (which historically has been a major part of Florida's economy), every visitor is offered a free cup of Florida citrus juice (orange or grapefruit).

In March 2016, Rayonier announced that they would be building a new corporate headquarters within the Yulee CCD. Rayonier also plans to develop a 24,000 acre pine forest in Yulee into a community complete with housing, offices, medical facilities, shopping centers, light industrial facilities and schools. The development, starting with 4,200 acres and is called Wildlight. Rayonier is also working with Nassau County to develop the Wildlight Elementary School at a cost of $26 million which is scheduled to open for the start of the 2017–2018 academic year with 600 students.

Local Government

Fire and rescue
The Yulee CCD is served by its own fire department  and two additional regional fire stations, the all-career Nassau County Fire Rescue Stations 30 and 70. The Yulee Volunteer Fire Department is dispatched along with the County department to all fire calls in the Yulee area.

Police services
The Nassau County Sheriff's Office provides services for the citizens within the Yulee CCD and Nassau County.  The Office of the Sheriff has a duty to enforce both the Florida Constitution and Florida state laws and statutes, and to provide for the security, safety and well-being of its citizens. This is accomplished through the delivery of law enforcement services, the operation of the Nassau County Jail and Detention Center, and the provision of court security. The Nassau County Sheriff's Office Headquarters is located at 76001 Bobby Moore Cir, Yulee, FL 32097.

Judicial complex
The Robert M. Foster Justice Center (previously known as the Nassau County, Florida Judicial Complex) is located within the Yulee CCD. The facility was opened in 2004 to augment the historic Nassau County Courthouse located in Fernandina Beach, Florida. This facility contains over 111,000 square feet and cost over $20 million to build.

Education

Higher Education

Florida State College at Jacksonville (FSCJ), a state college in the Florida College System, has a campus named the Nassau Center located within the Yulee CCD. The college is accredited by the Southern Association of Colleges and Schools. The Nassau Center offers courses, certificates, and degree programs in various fields and includes an Outdoor Education Center, which is a 16-acre natural space owned by FSCJ.

Also in the area are the University of North Florida, Jacksonville University in Jacksonville.

K-12 Education

Public primary and secondary schools in Yulee and Nassau County are administered by Nassau County Public Schools, which is governed by a six-member Nassau County School Board. In total 21 total schools comprise the Nassau County Public Schools and the system currently enrolls 11,155 students.

Public secondary schools:
Yulee High School (9-12)
Yulee Middle (6-8)

Public primary schools:
Wildlight Elementary School (Kindergarten-5 and ESE)
Yulee Elementary (3-5)
Yulee Primary (Pre Kindergarten-2)

Private schools:
 Faith Christian Academy (Pre Kindergarten-12)

Continuing Education
Yulee provides adult education in a variety of subjects at the FSCJ Nassau Center and at the Yulee Public Library.

Library
The Nassau County Public Library System has a Yulee Branch Library located within the Florida State College of Jacksonville Nassau Campus in Yulee.

Healthcare
There are 14 hospitals in or near the Yulee CCD.

Notable people

 Kris Anderson - Basketball player for Florida State and 4th round draft pick in the 1981 National Basketball Association draft by Milwaukee Bucks.
 George Crady -  (b 1931) former member of the Florida House of Representatives
 Kyle Denney - (b 1977) former Major League Baseball catcher for the Cleveland Indians.
 Derrick Henry - (b 1994) is a Heisman Trophy Winner football running back for the Tennessee Titans football.
 Apple Pope - American rugby league player who currently plays for the United States national rugby league team. 
 D. J. Stewart - (b 1993) is a professional baseball outfielder for the Baltimore Orioles
 Zack Taylor - (1898–1974) was a professional baseball player, coach, scout and manager.Major League Baseball player and manager for the St. Louis Browns
 Tom Schwartz - Entrepreneur, 'mactor' and star of Bravo's 'Vanderpump Rules'

See also
Nassau County, Florida
First Coast
Florida State College at Jacksonville
White Oak Conservation
White Oak Golf Course
First Coast Commuter Rail
Jacksonville Transportation Authority
Nassau County Soil and Water Conservation District
Yulee High School
Florida Welcome Center
Science First

Gallery

References

External links

FCCJ's Betty Cook Center 

Census-designated places in Nassau County, Florida
Census-designated places in the Jacksonville metropolitan area
Census-designated places in Florida